A12, A.12 or A-12 may refer to:

Aviation
 A-12 Avenger II, a Cold War–era American aircraft project that was canceled prior to production
 A-12 Shrike, a World War 2–era American attack aircraft
 Abrial A-12 Bagoas, a French experimental glider of the 1930s
 Aero A.12, a Czechoslovak light bomber built after World War I
 Lockheed A-12, codenamed Oxcart, a high-altitude, high-speed reconnaissance aircraft, manufactured for the CIA

Military
 Aggregate 12, a German rocket design in World War II that was never constructed
 , a French-built aircraft carrier in use by the Brazilian Navy
 , a British A-class submarine of the Royal Navy
 Matilda II (tank), built to General Staff specification A12, a British tank of World War 2

Science and technology
 A12 Authentication, a CHAP-based mechanism used by a CDMA2000 Access Network to authenticate a 1xEV-DO Access Terminal 
 ARM Cortex-A12, a 32-bit multicore processor
 Apple A12, a 7-nanometer 64-bit ARM SoC
 ATC code A12 Mineral supplements, a subgroup of the Anatomical Therapeutic Chemical Classification System
 British NVC community A12 (Potamogeton pectinatus community), a British Isles plant community
 A Rhodopsin-like receptors subfamily
 Samsung Galaxy A12, an Android phone

Other uses
 A12 road, in several countries
 Fiat A.12, a 1916 Italian, 6–cylinder, liquid-cooled in-line engine 
 LSWR A12 class, an 1887 British steam locomotive model
 Route A12 (WMATA), a bus route in Washington, USA
 A12 scale, musical tuning based on the 4:7:10 triad
 One of the Encyclopaedia of Chess Openings codes for the English Opening
 Unite the Right rally, referred to as "A12" locally, a white supremacist rally in Charlottesville, Virginia, which took place on August 12, 2017
 X Æ A-12, the son of Elon Musk